</noinclude>

The 2013 Big Ten women's basketball tournament was held March 7 through March 12 at the Sears Centre Arena in Hoffman Estates, Illinois. The Big Ten Network carried all games except the championship game which was aired by ESPN2. Purdue won the tournament and received an automatic bid to the 2013 NCAA tournament.

Seeds
All 12 Big Ten schools participated in the tournament. Teams were seeded by 2012–13 Big Ten Conference women's basketball season record.  The top four teams received a first round bye.

Schedule

Bracket
 All times are Eastern.

References

Big Ten women's basketball tournament
Big Ten women's basketball tournament
Big Ten
Big Ten women's basketball tournament
Women's sports in Illinois